Stig Inge Bjørnebye (born 11 December 1969) is a Norwegian former professional footballer who played in Norway, England, and Denmark, most notably for Liverpool, and is currently the sports director of the Danish football club AGF Aarhus. His preferred position was left back, which he occupied for domestic clubs and the national team. Bjørnebye was appointed assistant manager of Norway in 2003, relinquishing the role three years later to succeed Tom Nordlie as manager of IK Start. He was the sports director of Rosenborg Ballklub from March 2015 until November 2019.

For club and country, Bjørnebye was noted for his precise deliveries from the flanks. Described as a "solid, no-nonsense full-back", Bjørnebye played competitive football for 16 years, and appeared in 194 Premier League matches, until injury compelled retirement in March 2003. He represented the Norwegian national team in the 1994 and 1998 FIFA World Cup and the Euro 2000 and was capped 75 times, scoring once.

Club career 
Stig Inge Bjørnebye was born in Elverum, the son of skier Jo Inge Bjørnebye, who competed in the 1968 and 1972 Winter Olympics. As a child, Bjørnebye exhibited an interest in emulating his father by becoming a ski jumper.

His footballing career began as a youth player with home club Elverum IL, before joining Strømmen IF in the late 1980s. He moved to Kongsvinger IL in 1989, establishing himself as a first-team regular in the Norwegian top division. After three seasons with Kongsvinger, he transferred to Rosenborg in 1992, where he in his inaugural season won the Norwegian top division and the Norwegian Cup, in the final of which he scored the deciding goal against Lillestrøm SK.

His performances merited inclusion in the national team and attracted the attention of Liverpool's manager Graeme Souness, who bought Bjørnebye for £600,000 less than one year after moving to Rosenborg. Signed as a replacement for David Burrows, Bjørnebye debuted inauspiciously on 19 December 1992 in a 5–1 defeat to Coventry City. Initial difficulties adapting to the Premier League caused many fans to question his displays on the pitch and he returned to Norway on loan to Rosenborg in 1994.

Bjørnebye's experiences as a Reds' player in the 1994–95 season, under the management of Roy Evans, were markedly more successful than that of previous campaigns. He gained a regular place in the senior team, supplanting the left back position from Julian Dicks, and featured in the 2–1 win against Bolton Wanderers in the final of the 1995 League Cup Final on 2 April 1995. Subsequent injury, a broken leg sustained on 5 April 1995 in a 3–1 win match against Southampton, terminated his season and he was replaced by Steve Harkness.

Unavailable for several months, Bjørnebye appeared just twice for Liverpool in the 1995–96 season. Recovery and injuries to other left back candidates enabled Bjørnebye to reclaim his place the following season, in which he scored his first goal for Liverpool on 17 August 1996 in a 3–3 draw against Middlesbrough. He contributed to the club's most convincing title challenge since the inception of the Premier League by supplying club strikers Stan Collymore and Robbie Fowler with precise crosses. He was ultimately included in the PFA Team of the Year with Steve McManaman and Mark Wright. The acquisition of Steve Staunton and arrival of Gérard Houllier in the 1998–99 season, limited Bjørnebye's first-team opportunities, leading to his effective marginalisation. Bjørnebye affirmed his recurring determination to stay at Liverpool that season, remarking "If I didn't have any fight in my stomach I'd have left Liverpool at least three times before".

Unable to displace Staunton and Dominic Matteo, Bjørnebye agreed to a loan move to Danish side Brøndby IF in 2000, who finished second in the Danish Superliga with Bjørnebye on the team. He decided to permanently leave Liverpool after returning from the European Championship, accepting a £300,000 transfer to Blackburn Rovers that reunited him with former manager Graeme Souness. Promotion to the Premier League was achieved in his first year with Rovers, in the process, Bjørnebye scored his only goal for the club on 11 November 2000, in a 2–2 draw against Portsmouth. His final trophy was gained when Blackburn defeated Tottenham Hotspur 2–1 in the 2002 League Cup Final. Successive injuries after the cup victory disrupted and eventually ended his career as a footballer. While preparing for the 2002–03 season, Bjørnebye fractured his eye socket in a training accident. He complained of double vision, underwent surgery, and was rendered unavailable for seven months. Further injury inflicted during a League Cup match on 17 December 2002, in a 2–0 win against Wigan Athletic escalated, while Bjørnebye was recovering in Norway, necessitating emergency surgery to avert the possibility of foot amputation. Bjørnebye announced his retirement on 11 March 2003. Blackburn manager Graeme Souness reacted to the decision with a statement:

International career 
Bjørnebye was capped 75 times by Norway, scoring once – an olympic goal in a 1–0 friendly against the United States on 8 September 1993. Having represented his country at youth, under-21, and "B" level, Bjørnebye debuted for the senior team on 31 May 1989 against Austria. The majority of his caps were collected during Egil Olsen's eight-year tenure as manager of Norway. Under Olsen's guidance, Norway employed a "long ball" policy that was contingent on the height of Olsen's squad. The tactic of directing long passes to the tall winger Jostein Flo, principally delivered by Bjørnebye, became popularly referred to in Norway as the "Flo Pass" (Flo-pasningen). Although criticised for employing the long-ball approach and maintaining a defensively-orientated mentality, Olsen secured qualification for the World Cups of 1994 and 1998. Bjørnebye participated in both tournaments – seven matches in total.

He decided to retire from international football after the 1998 World Cup, intending to focus on his domestic career and family. Bjørnebye unexpectedly reversed his decision after Nils Johan Semb persuaded him to return to the squad for Euro 2000. Unused in Norway's 1–0 win against Spain on 13 June 2000, Bjørnebye was first introduced to the competition in the second match of the group stage, in a 0–1 loss on 18 June 2000 against Yugoslavia, as a 35-minute substitute for his Liverpool colleague Vegard Heggem. He retained his place, featuring in the goalless draw against Slovenia on 21 June 2000, which eliminated Norway from the tournament. His final international match was in a 1–1 draw World Cup qualifier on 7 October 2000 against Wales, placing him ninth in the overall record of appearances for Norway as of 2007.

Managerial career 
Bjørnebye returned to football in a non-playing capacity when he was selected by the Norwegian Football Association to replace Harald Aabrekk as Norway's assistant manager, subordinate to the newly appointed Åge Hareide. Prior to the announcement, the media in England had reported that Bjørnebye was considering maintaining a relationship with Blackburn by becoming a scout for the club. He vacated his position in 2006 to succeed Tom Nordlie as manager of IK Start. Success was forthcoming in his first season; the club competed in Europe and Bjørnebye was the highest earning coach of the season, ahead of his predecessor Nordlie, with an income of almost seven million krone. His appointment lasted two seasons, ending with dismissal in September 2007, after a series of poor results that placed the club in serious danger of being relegated from the Tippeligaen. He was replaced by Benny Lennartsson, who was unable to preserve the club's premier league status; Start were relegated to Norway's second tier.

On 15 March 2015, Stig Inge Bjørnebye succeeded Erik Hoftun as the sports director of Eliteserien club, Rosenborg Ballklub. He since has won The Double with Rosenborg Ballklub two years in a row, in 2015 and 2016. Rosenborg Ballklub is the first club in the history of Norwegian football to do so two years in a row. As the sports director of Rosenborg Ballklub he has many responsibilities, among many others signing on new players and renewing contracts with existing players. The most notable signing came on 6 March 2017: Nicklas Bendtner signed on for a three-year contract with the Norwegian side. This was the most surprising and most notable signing in the history of Norwegian football. Teammate Pål André Helland commented: "It shouldn't come as a surprise if he becomes the top scorer and we win the league."

Personal life 
Bjørnebye is married to the former Byåsen IL handball player Hege Frøseth, with whom he has three children.

Career statistics

Club

International 

Scores and results list Norway's goal tally first, score column indicates score after Bjørnebye goal.

Managerial statistics
Source:

Honours 
Rosenborg
 Tippeligaen: 1992, 1994
 Norwegian Football Cup: 1992

Liverpool
 Football League Cup: 1994–95

Blackburn Rovers
 Football League Cup: 2001–02

Individual
PFA Team of the Year: 1996–97 Premier League

References

External links 
 Stig Inge Bjørnebye career stats at Brøndby IF 
 

1969 births
Living people
People from Elverum
Association football fullbacks
Norwegian footballers
Norway international footballers
Norway youth international footballers
Norway under-21 international footballers
Strømmen IF players
Kongsvinger IL Toppfotball players
Rosenborg BK players
Liverpool F.C. players
Brøndby IF players
Blackburn Rovers F.C. players
1994 FIFA World Cup players
1998 FIFA World Cup players
UEFA Euro 2000 players
Premier League players
Danish Superliga players
Eliteserien players
Norwegian football managers
IK Start managers
Norwegian expatriate footballers
Expatriate men's footballers in Denmark
Expatriate footballers in England
Norwegian expatriate sportspeople in Denmark
Norwegian expatriate sportspeople in England
Association football scouts
Blackburn Rovers F.C. non-playing staff
Sportspeople from Innlandet